Vangeliya Pandeva Gushterova (3 October 1911 – 11 August 1996), commonly known as Baba Vanga (more accurately 'aunt Vanga'), was a Bulgarian mystic and herbalist. Blind since early childhood, Baba Vanga spent most of her life in the Rupite area of the Kozhuh mountains in Bulgaria.

In the late 1970s and 1980s, she was widely known in Eastern Europe for her alleged abilities of clairvoyance and precognition. Zheni Kostadinova claimed in 1997 that millions of people believed she possessed paranormal abilities.

Life 
Vanga was born on 3 October 1911 to Pando Surchev (7 May 1873 – 8 November 1940) and Paraskeva Surcheva in Strumica. She was a premature baby who suffered from health complications. In accordance with local tradition, the baby was not given a name until she was deemed likely to survive. When the baby first cried out, a midwife went into the street and asked a stranger for a name. The stranger proposed Andromaha (Andromache), but this was rejected for being "too Greek" during a period of anti-Hellenic sentiment within Macedonian Bulgarian society. Another stranger's proposal was a Greek name, which was adapted to the Bulgarian version: Vangelia. According to the Bucharest treaty (1913), Strumica was ceded to Bulgaria. 

During her childhood, her father was an Internal Macedonian Revolutionary Organization activist, conscripted into the Bulgarian Army during World War I, and her mother died soon after. This left Vanga dependent on the care and charity of neighbours and close family friends for much of her youth. After the war, Strumica was ceded to the Kingdom of Serbs, Croats and Slovenes (i.e., Yugoslavia). Yugoslav authorities arrested her father because of his pro-Bulgarian activity. They confiscated all his property and the family fell into poverty for many years. Vanga was considered intelligent for her age. Her inclinations started to show up when she herself thought out games and loved playing "healing"—she prescribed some herbs to her friends, who pretended to be ill. Her father, being a widower, eventually remarried, thus providing a stepmother to his daughter.

According to her own testimony, a turning point in her life occurred when a 'tornado' allegedly lifted her into the air and threw her into a nearby field. She was found after a long search. Witnesses described her as very frightened, and her eyes were covered with sand and dust; she was unable to open them because of the pain. There was money only for a partial operation to heal the injuries she had sustained. This resulted in a gradual loss of sight.

In 1925, Vanga was taken to a school for the blind in the city of Zemun, in the Kingdom of Serbs, Croats and Slovenes, where she spent three years and was taught to read Braille, play the piano, knit, cook, and clean. After the death of her stepmother, she returned home to take care of her younger siblings. The family lived in poverty. 

In 1939, Vanga contracted pleurisy. The doctor's opinion was that she would die soon, but she quickly recovered.

During World War II, Yugoslavia was invaded and dismembered by the Axis powers and Strumica was annexed by Bulgaria. At that time Vanga attracted believers in her ability to heal and soothsay—a number of people visited her, hoping to get a hint about whether their relatives were alive, or seeking for the place where they died. On 8 April 1942 the Bulgarian tzar Boris III visited her.

On 10 May 1942, Vanga married Dimitar Gushterov. Gusheterov, a Bulgarian soldier from the village of Krandzhilitsa near Petrich, had come to town seeking revenge for his brother's killing. Shortly before marriage, Dimitar and Vanga moved to Petrich, where she soon became well-known. Dimitar was then conscripted in the Bulgarian Army and was stationed in Northern Greece, which was annexed by Bulgaria at the time. Gushterov became ill,  fell into alcoholism, and eventually died on 1 April 1962.

Baba Vanga continued to be visited by dignitaries and commoners. After World War II, Bulgarian politicians and leaders from different Soviet Republics, including, reportedly, General Secretary of the Communist Party of the Soviet Union Leonid Brezhnev. In the 1990s, a church was built in Rupite with money left by her visitors. Vanga died on 11 August 1996 from breast cancer. Her funeral attracted large crowds.

Fulfilling Vanga's last will and testament, her Petrich house was turned into a museum, which opened its doors for visitors on 5 May 2008.

Work 

Vanga was semi-literate in Bulgarian; she could read some Braille in Serbian.  Though she did not write any books herself, what she said or allegedly said was captured by staff members. Later, numerous esoteric books on Vanga's life and predictions were written.

Sources such as The Weiser Field Guide to the Paranormal claim that she foretold the break-up of the Soviet Union, the Chernobyl disaster, the date of Stalin's death, the sinking of the Russian submarine Kursk, the September 11 attacks, Topalov's victory in the world chess tournament, the tensions with North Korea. On the other hand, Bulgarian sources say that the people who were close to her claim that she never prophesied about Kursk, World War III, circulating on the Internet, and that many of the myths about Vanga are simply not true. Some evidence has also been presented that Baba Vanga did not make many of the predictions now attributed to her, but rather people frequently attribute new fake "prophecies" to her since her death, and the lack of a written record of her prophecies makes any prediction attributed to her difficult to disprove.

In 1966, following her increase in popularity and overwhelming numbers of people wanting to see her, the Bulgarian government put Vanga on the state payroll. She was given two secretaries and a panel to interview potential patients. In addition, the Institutes of Suggestology and Parapsychology in Sofia and Petrich studied Vanga's psychic abilities.

In early August 1976, Bosnian singer-actress Silvana Armenulić was on tour in Bulgaria and decided to meet with Baba Vanga. Vanga only sat and stared out a window with her back to Silvana, never speaking to her. After a long time, Vanga finally spoke: "Nothing. You do not have to pay. I do not want to speak with you. Not now. Go and come back in three months." As Silvana turned around and walked toward the door, Vanga said, "Wait. In fact, you will not be able to come. Go, go. If you can come back in three months, do so." Silvana took this as confirmation that she would die and left Vanga's home in tears. Armenulić died two months later, 10 October 1976, in a car crash with her sister Mirjana.

Vanga incorrectly predicted that the 1994 FIFA World Cup Final would be played between "two teams beginning with B." One finalist was Brazil, but Bulgaria was eliminated by Italy in the semifinals. According to The National, Vanga predicted that World War III would start in November 2010 and last until October 2014.

Followers of Vanga believe that she predicted the precise date of her own death, dreaming that she would die on 11 August and be buried on 13 August. Shortly before that she had said that a ten-year-old blind girl living in France was to inherit her gift, and that people would soon hear about her.

Another prediction attributed to her is that the 44th President would be African-American, but she also claimed that he would be the last one. Vanga's supporters also claimed that she predicted the 45th president would have a "messianic personality," and would be faced with a crisis that eventually "brings the country down".

Studies on Baba Vanga 
An attempt was made in 2011 to systematically summarize the existing knowledge about Vanga in the documentary Vanga: The Visible and Invisible World. The movie includes interviews with some of the people who met Vanga in person, including Sergey Medvedev (press secretary to the then-President of Russia Boris Yeltsin in 1995–96; who visited as Yeltsin's envoy), Neshka Robeva (Bulgarian rhythmic gymnast and coach), Sergey Mikhalkov (Soviet and Russian writer, author of the Soviet Union anthem), Nevena Tosheva (director of the first documentary about Vanga), and Kirsan Ilyumzhinov (Kalmyk multi-millionaire businessman and politician). According to the documentary, Baba Vanga predicted Yeltsin's second electoral victory in 1995, and warned him about his heart condition.

Several researchers have studied the phenomenon of Vanga in an attempt to establish whether she has any extraordinary capabilities. Bulgarian psychiatrists  and Georgi Lozanov also studied the capabilities of Vanga. Shiela Ostrander and Lynn Schroeder claim that documentation done by scientists   Vanga's predictive abilities, particularly in terms of finding lost relatives and friends, are about 80 % accurate.

Additionally, a book was written about her by Russian writer and publicist Andrei Kudin.

In popular culture and criticism 

One of the first studies of Vanga's abilities, initiated by the Bulgarian government,  was described in the 1977 movie Fenomen. 

Vangelia, a 24-episode TV series with elements of mysticism, was commissioned in 2013 by Channel One Russia.

The supposed clairvoyant's predictions, political speculations with them, and their criticism continue to appear in the mass media in different countries and in different languages.

Her predictions and persona remain popular in parts of Southeast Europe, primarily Bulgaria and North Macedonia, as well as parts of Eastern Europe, especially Russia. Russian publications related to the mysterious prophetess are numerous. "The Great Encyclopedia of Vanga" is a Russian online project dedicated to her.

 Eugene Alexandrov, Chairman of the Commission for Combating Pseudoscience and Falsification of Scientific Research, referring to the opinion of another member of the commission, described the Vanga phenomenon as follows:

However, after the Metropolitan visited Vanga with a relic cross with a particle of the Holy Cross of the Lord, the following happened:

Unfulfilled predictions and myths associated with Vanga 

Vanga's name is often mentioned in the pages of the yellow press. Vanga is credited with various predictions, which often contradict each other. There are no documented opinions that Vanga predicted the death of Stalin, the accident at the Chernobyl nuclear power plant, the victory of Boris Yeltsin in the 1996 presidential elections, the September 11 attacks, or Veselin Topalov's victory at the World Chess Championship. In early 1993, Vanga seemed to announce that the USSR would be revived in the first quarter of the 21st century and Bulgaria would be part of it. And in Russia many new people will be born who will be able to change the world. In 1994, Vanga predicted: "At the beginning of the 21st century, humanity will get rid of cancer. The day will come, and the cancer will be chained in 'iron chains.'" She clarified these words in such a way that "the medicine against cancer should contain a lot of iron." She also believed that a cure for old age would be invented. It will be made from the hormones of a horse, a dog and a turtle: "The horse is strong, the dog is hardy, and the turtle lives a long time." Before her death, Vanga said, "There will come a time of miracles and a time of great discoveries in the field of the immaterial. There will also be great archaeological discoveries that will fundamentally change our understanding of the world since ancient times. So, it is predetermined." For example, after the Fukushima nuclear accident, Komsomolskaya Pravda reported the impending nuclear disaster, which Vanga allegedly predicted: "As a result of radioactive fallout in the northern hemisphere, there will not be any animals or vegetation," and after 2.5 years reluctantly recognized this prophecy as unfulfilled.

At the same time, people who knew Vanga personally say that she did not give predictions about the deaths on the Kursk submarine, like other events, and most of all these messages are myths and not true. There are numerous cases attributed to Vanga which did not actually come true. For example, she predicted that in the final of the World Cup 1994 "two teams that start with the letter 'B'" would compete, but in the finals of all countries whose names start with the letter "B", only Brazil remained, while Bulgaria lost in the semifinals to Italy and remained fourth. Vanga allegedly predicted that the Third World War would begin in November 2010 and end in October 2014. According to the testimony of Vanga's close friends, she never predicted the outbreak of the Third World War and the subsequent end of the world.

Unfulfilled predictions from Vanga (from the book by L. Orlova Vanga. A Look at Russia):
 2010: The World War will begin in November 2010 and end in October 2014. It will start as usual, then nuclear weapons will be used first, and then chemical weapons.
 2011: As a result of the radioactive fallout, neither animals nor vegetation will remain in the Northern Hemisphere. Then Muslims will start a chemical war against the surviving Europeans.
 2014: Most people will suffer from ulcers, skin cancer, and other skin diseases as a consequence of chemical warfare.
 2016: Europe will be almost deserted.

Anatoly Stroyev, who was in 1985–1989 his own correspondent for Komsomolskaya Pravda in Bulgaria, believes that in the USSR "journalists invented sensations [about Vanga] for the sake of circulation." He spoke about several cases when Vanga was grossly mistaken. The first was his arrival with a journalist who was heading to Vanga for help, and she said that she would never marry and would not have children, although after returning to Moscow, she married and gave birth to a daughter within a year. In the second case, in the late 1980s, several children disappeared in Volgograd at once, and two correspondents from a popular magazine went to Vanga, who allegedly told them that the children were alive and would soon be found, but they were never found. The third case was history in 1991, when during the war of independence in Croatia, Soviet journalists Viktor Nogin and Gennady Kurinnoy disappeared, and Vanga said they were both alive, although it was later revealed that they were shot on charges of espionage for Croatia. Stroyev also refutes the well-known myth about the "alarm clock for Gagarin", which the clairvoyant's niece Krasimira Stoyanov cites in her book The Truth About Vanga, when the actor Vyacheslav Tikhonov allegedly came to Vanga and she told him, "Why didn't you fulfill the wishes of your best friend Yuri Gagarin? Before his last flight, he came to your home and said: 'I have no time, so buy an alarm clock and keep it on your desk. Let this alarm remind you of me'". After that, Tikhonov allegedly became ill. Subsequently, Tikhonov allegedly said that after the death of Gagarin, he, grievingly experiencing the death of his friend, forgot to buy an alarm clock. Stroyev notes that in 1990, at the premiere of the film The Crazy Bus, he met Tikhonov in the cinema and said: "Vyacheslav Vasilyevich, comment on the story with Vanga!" Tikhonov, in turn, said: "In one word? Lies! I beg you, write: there was nothing of the kind. I didn’t promise Gagarin any alarm clock! Yes, we didn’t know each other. I saw him only from a distance at official events, nothing more."

In addition, Stroyev notes that the prediction attributed to Vanga about the sinking of the Russian submarine Kursk is a pseudo-prophecy, which, even during her lifetime and long before the sinking of Kursk, was "refuted from her words by journalist Ventsislav Zashev."

Former President of the USSR Mikhail Gorbachev denied that he was with Vanga, and she predicted the collapse of the USSR. At the same time, Gorbachev said that "even before I came to power, her forecast that Mikhail would come to rule" was conveyed, but noted that "all this is, by and large, nonsense", since he is "very critical" of "psychics, clairvoyants and others" and does not trust the seers.

In a 1997 interview, Bedros Kirkorov said that there was no special prophecy about the fate of his son Philipp. Despite this, the media is circulating a legend about the role that Vanga allegedly played in the life of the Kirkorov family. It is stated that after Philip fell ill at the age of four, his parents took him to Vanga, who stated that the boy would recover, and also predicted that he would have a great future, since she allegedly saw him with a metal stick on the mountain around which admired people gathered, which is interpreted as the performance of Philipp with a microphone at the music Olympus. At the same time, Vanga allegedly predicted that he would marry at the age of twenty-seven to a woman with a name beginning with the letter "A", and the birth of a daughter at 44 from a surrogate mother.

In 2004, the illusionist Yuri Gorny, in an interview with the magazine Science and Life, said that the famous journalist and diplomat AE Bovin, who visited Vanga, noted that she "absolutely did not guess anything in his past, or in the present, or, as it soon turned out, in the near future". Gorny himself recalled that he offered his acquaintance a well-known journalist, whose last name he did not name "for reasons that will become clear a little later" to check the perspicacity of Vanga and her possible informants. To do this, he suggested to the journalist, whom the hospitable hosts, who helped him arrange a meeting with Vanga, invited to the sauna, "before visiting the bath, seal a part of the scrotum with a plaster. He recommended that he not answer questions, if any. Just make it clear that he does not want to talk about this topic". When a meeting with Vanga took place a week later, she, as Gorny notes, "described quite accurately what happened to my acquaintance in the past, which, however, is not very surprising: he is a famous person, she would have been able to learn about his life in a week and an ordinary astrologer". Regarding Vanga's prediction of the future, according to Gorny, the following happened:

The attitude of the special services of Bulgaria and the USSR 

Retired KGB Lieutenant General Oleg Leonov sent Soviet psychic Vladimir Safonov to Bulgaria several times to study Vanga, who, as Leonov believed, "was more adept than a Bulgarian healer in his abilities."

Retired KGB Lieutenant Colonel Yevgeny Sergienko noted that "she was often mistaken, but it was not customary to disclose it," since "people of the highest flight were sent to Vanga," and therefore she was "a way of obtaining information" for the KGB. Sergienko expressed the opinion that "it cannot be said that Vanga worked for the KGB, but her assistants cooperated with us," because with their help "our agents received the necessary information." And for this, special services "in every possible way contributed to the formation of legends about miraculous healers on a mass scale." Sergienko said that he knows "a Bulgarian journalist who was targeted by the special services to promote the popularity of Vanga," and he launched the legend about the healer, which the Bulgarian special services helped to develop further, since "it was beneficial for both of them and for the KGB."

See also 
 Cheiro
 Edgar Cayce
 Eschatology
 Eugenia Davitashvili (Djuna)
 Nostradamus
 The Delphic Oracle

References

Other sources

External links 

 
 Stephen Kinzer: Rupite Journal; For a Revered Mystic, a Shrine Now of Her Own in The New York Times, April 5, 1995
 An article by Natalia Baltzun, translated by Kristina Hristova (Bulgaria) 
 Vanga's Prophecies: Product of the Bulgarian Secret Services 

1911 births
1996 deaths
People from Strumica
People from Petrich
Bulgarian psychics
Clairvoyants
Deaths from cancer in Bulgaria
Deaths from breast cancer
20th-century Bulgarian people
20th-century Bulgarian women
Macedonian Bulgarians
Bulgarian blind people
Women mystics